Chennai 2 Singapore is a 2017 Tamil-language romantic comedy film written and directed by Abbas Akbar, featuring Gokul Anand, Anju Kurian, and Rajesh Balachandiran in the lead roles. The film was jointly produced by Comicbook and the Media Development Authority Singapore (now known as IMDA), Ghibran, Vrobal and MM2 Entertainment Pte Ltd and co-produced by Shabir.  Chennai2Singapore is the first collaboration between the Indian Tamil and Singaporean film industries.

Plot
The film starts with two men expressing their gratitude in a cemetery about a person who changed their life. The film then moves to a flashback.

The film is about a struggling Indian filmmaker, Harish (Gokul Anand), who makes his way to Singapore to look for investors to finance his dream movie. However, a series of misfortunes foils his plans, and he also ends up losing his passport. At a loss, Harish meets Vaanambadi (Rajesh Balachandran), an eccentric Singaporean cameraman. With Vaanambaadi's advice and help, they meet a producer Michael (Shiv Keshav), who advises Harish to script on a romantic film instead of a sentimental film. Without a script, Harish becomes heartbroken. But then he meets a girl Roshini (Anju Kurian), who is dying from cancer, and gets swept up in a number of hilarious but serious situations. Harish begins to script on these events. He motivates Roshini not to lose heart and to stay positive. He eventually falls in love with her. Roshini's father (L. Raja) talks to Harish about her cancer and how things took a turn when it was known that she had cancer. He tells Harish that he wants a huge sum of money to cure her. Harish and Vaanambadi rob Michael by blackmailing him using his mistress.

Papablast (Emzee Jazz), a comedy don, is assigned the work of kidnapping Roshini and the duo by Michael. Papablast successfully kidnaps the trio but unfortunately falls into his own prey leading to the trio's escape. Harish uses the money to save Roshini, and she gets cured.

Some months later in the present, it is revealed that Harish was praying to Papablast and made a film about his own story. The film ends with the trio leaving on a car.

Cast
 Gokul Anand as Harish
 Anju Kurian as Roshini
 Rajesh Balachandran as Vaanambadi
 Shiv Keshav as Michael
 Emcee Jesz as PapaBlast
 Sumithra as Harish's mother
 L. Raja as Roshini's father
 Vijay Pranav as Kaviarasan
 M. Kannan as Financier
 Chadru as Saleem
 "Anbaana" Arun as Bhaskar
 Prem Kumar as Pazhani

Production
In 2011, Abbas Akbar approached director Venkat Prabhu with the script of the film, hoping that the director would work on the project as an executive producer. Akbar held initial talks with Dinesh to play the lead role, but Prabhu's decision not to produce the film meant that Dinesh also opted against working on the project. Akbar later approached actor R. Madhavan and narrated the script of the film to him, but the actor was busy with the production of Irudhi Suttru (2016) and was not interested in immediately beginning the project. Abbas Akbar secured a fund from the Media Development Authority in Singapore to make the film, while he also sold his house to raise funds. The first schedule began in Chennai and was completed by September 2014. The second schedule of the film began in October 2014 in Singapore and featured a combination of cast members from India and Singapore. Sathya and Hebah Patel began working on the film but the project soon ran into trouble after the film was half complete. The director and Sathya had creative differences after Sathya had refused to attend rehearsals and was subsequently removed from the film. The film was subsequently started with newcomers throughout 2015 and successfully finished by 2016.

Soundtrack

Music composer, Mohamaad Ghibran announced on his social media pages that the audio launch will be done through a uniquely designed Audio Drive.  Ghibran and director Abbas Akbar planned to undertake the cross-country trip from Chennai to Singapore, where each song number was released on YouTube at each border, from Chennai to Singapore, crossing Bhutan, Myanmar, Thailand and Malaysia! Engaging his fans and friends through his social media pages, Ghibran asked for advice about the road trip. He also sent a wish for Ajith Kumar, known for his road skills, to offer his advice.

The historic Audio Drive flag-off event took place on 1 June 2016 at Sathyam Theatres Chennai was graced by popular Kollywood actor Suriya. The event garnered an outstanding media presence and wide publicity for the film and its prolific efforts to release each single. The first song that was released in Chennai, “Vaadi Vaadi” topped the charts on the popular radio station, Radio Mirchi, for over a week in June 2016, and went on to top the weekly charts on other stations such as Big FM, Radio City, and Suryan FM. The vibrant song also took the top spot for overall airplay across Chennai’s FMs in June and July2016. The complete soundtrack of Chennai 2 Singapore claimed an impressive 1st spot on iTunes All India Music Store due to its snazzy city-styled numbers and Apple Music chose “Vaadi Vaadi” as its best song of the week in August 2016.

Reception
The film released to good audience reviews particularly with the younger audience.

References

External links
 

2017 films
2010s Tamil-language films
Indian romantic comedy films
Singaporean romantic comedy films
2017 romantic comedy films